Trevor Tombe is a Canadian economist has published articles in  American Economic Review, Journal of Monetary Economics, Review of Economic Dynamics, and Canadian Journal of Economics, among others. Trevor is also a regular contributor to The Hub.

Education
After completing his BBA in Finance and Economics, 2005 at Simon Fraser University in 2005, and completed his M.A. in economics in 2006 and his PhD in economics in 2011 from University of Toronto.

Career

He is Associate Professor at the University of Calgary.

Publications
He has published in American Economic Review, Journal of Monetary Economics, Review of Economic Dynamics, and Canadian Journal of Economics, among others.

Research topics

Research topics include "economic and fiscal integration, internal trade, and fiscal federalism".

References

Canadian economists
Canadian social scientists
Academic staff of the University of Calgary
Living people
University of Toronto alumni
Simon Fraser University alumni
Year of birth missing (living people)